Susan Accushla Wilson  is a New Zealand director and actor. Wilson was one of the founders of Wellington's Circa Theatre and the Circa Council in 1976 and has had a long career at the theatre as a stage actor and director.

Acting
Wilson played the role of Beryl in the popular television programme Gliding On over 5 series between 1981 and 1985.  Her work in television also includes roles in Mortimer's Patch, and Close to Home.  She also appeared as Aunt Daisy in an episode of Pioneer Women.

Director
Wilson's productions include many winners of Chapman Tripp Theatre Awards including Angels in America, Joyful and Triumphant, Arcadia, and Death of a Salesman.

She has been a script advisor for Playmarket and Television New Zealand script editor.

As of 2021, Wilson continues as a Director at Circa Theatre. Wilson has been directing pantomimes at Circa Theatre over years, a recent was Cinderella (2020) written by Simon Leary & Gavin Rutherford.

Honours and awards
In 1982, Wilson won Best Actress in the Feltex Television Awards, for Mortimer's Patch and Gliding On.

In 1992, Wilson won the Best Director award at the Chapman Tripp Theatre Awards for her direction of Robert Lord's Joyful and Triumphant. She won the same award again in 1994 for her production of Angels in America.

In 2006, Wilson won Director of the Year in the Chapman Tripp Theatre Awards for Death of a Salesman.

In the 2001 Queen’s Birthday Honours, Wilson was appointed an Officer of the New Zealand Order of Merit, for services to theatre.

References

Further reading 

 Tales from the rabbit warren. Evening post (Wellington, N.Z.), 24 Aug 1989; p. 27
 From famous spinster to famous aunt. New Zealand woman's weekly, 23 Jan 1989; p. 32-33
 Susan Wilson. Dominion post (Wellington, N.Z.), 10 Aug 2013; sup.p.15

External links
Interview with Susan Wilson (2019)

Living people
Year of birth missing (living people)

New Zealand actresses
Officers of the New Zealand Order of Merit
New Zealand theatre directors